Harbayeh-ye Shalageh (also Romanized as Ḩarbāyeh-ye Shalāgeh; also known as Ḩarbābeh-ye Shalāgeh) is a village in Hoveyzeh Rural District, in the Central District of Hoveyzeh County, Khuzestan Province, Iran. At the 2006 census, its population was 57, in 10 families.

References 

Populated places in Hoveyzeh County